Lords of Acid is a Belgian/American electronic dance music (EDM) group led by musician Praga Khan. They are best known for making songs with sexual lyrics and sexually explicit tracks, such as their hit "Pussy".

History 
Lords of Acid debuted with the new beat single "I Sit on Acid" in 1988. Created by Praga Khan, Olivier Adams, and Jade 4U; their debut album, 1991's Lust (along with additional singles "Rough Sex" and "I Must Increase My Bust"). Their second album, Voodoo-U (1994), features  Industrial dance music. This was followed by Our Little Secret (1997), a B-side compilation titled Heaven Is an Orgasm (1998), and a remix album titled Expand Your Head (1999). In 2000 they released a more rock-influenced fourth album titled Farstucker and in 2003, after being in the business for fifteen years, released a greatest hits album called Greatest T*ts.

Their fifth album Deep Chills was released on 10 April 2012. Tracks on the album included "Children of Acid", "Paranormal Energy" with Zak Bagans, and "Pop That Tooshie" with Alana Evans.

In 2017, Lords of Acid re-released their back catalogue of albums through Metropolis Records as Special Remastered Band Editions, the albums featured bonus tracks selected from B-sides from singles with artwork re-designed by artist/producer Jo-Z Lords. In 2018, Lords of Acid released their sixth album Pretty in Kink following a successful Kickstarter campaign.

Lords of Acid's soundtrack credits include Austin Powers: The Spy Who Shagged Me, Sliver, Strange Days, Bad Lieutenant, Paparazzi, Virtuosity and Sucker Punch.

Band members

Current members
 Praga Khan – keyboards, programming, backing vocals
 Galen Waling – drums
 DieTrich Thrall – bass
 Mark Thwaite – guitars
 Gigi Ricci – lead vocals

Key former members
 Olivier Adams – keyboards, programming, drums, backing vocals
 Ludo Camberlin (a.k.a. Carl S. Johansen) – guitars, keyboards, programming
 Ruth McArdle (a.k.a. Lady Galore and Cherrie Blue) – vocals on Voodoo-U
 Deborah Ostrega – lead vocals on Farstucker and Private Parts
 Nikkie Van Lierop (a.k.a. Jade 4U and Darling Nikkie) – lead vocals, keyboards, programming
 Mea Fisher (a.k.a. DJ Méa) – lead vocals on Deep Chills
 Erhan Kurken – guitars, keyboards, programming
 Sin Quirin - guitars
 Marieke Bresseleers – lead vocals on Pretty in Kink

Other contributors 
 Zak Bagans – guest vocals
 Corina Braemt (a.k.a. Laurena) – Backing Vocals
 Hans Bruyninckx (a.k.a. Hans-X)
 Rocco Corsari – guest vocals
 Wim Daans (a.k.a. Shai de la Luna) – live keyboards, programming
 Erica Dilanjian – live backing vocals (Sextremefest tour)
 Natalie Delaet – live vocals, dancer
 Murv Douglas – live bass (Sextreme Ball, SonicAngel tour)
 Glenn Engelen – music and arrangements
 Alana Evans – guest vocals
 Kurt Liekens (a.k.a. Kurt McGuinness) – drums, electronic percussion
 Joe Haze – live guitars (Sextremefest tour)
 Tejo De Roeck (a.k.a. Tej-Doo) – additional keyboards and programming
 Kirk Salvador – live drums, electronic percussion (Sextreme Ball, SonicAngel Tour)
 Roland Turner – live keyboards (Sextremefest tour)
 Inja Van Gastel – live backing vocals, keyboards, dancer
 Virus – live guitars (Sextreme Ball, SonicAngel tour)
 Doggy Dave – live bass (2018)

Timeline

Discography

 Lust (1991)
 Voodoo-U (1994)
 Our Little Secret (1997)
 Farstucker (2001)
 Deep Chills (2012)
 Pretty in Kink (2018)
 Beyond Booze (2022)

References

External links
Lords of Acid website
Children of Acid website
Lords of Acid on Discogs

1988 establishments in Belgium
Acid house groups
Belgian new beat music groups
Belgian house music groups
Belgian industrial music groups
Belgian techno music groups
Caroline Records artists
Metropolis Records artists
Musical quintets